Khersdar may refer to:
Khers Dar
Khersdar Darreh Dimeh
Khersdar-e Kakamorad
Khersdar-e Olya
Khersdar-e Sofla